The Noda Cabinet governed Japan from September 2011 to December 2012 under the leadership of Prime Minister Yoshihiko Noda, who came into power after winning the DPJ leadership in September 2011. The Cabinet enacted economic reforms to reduce the burden of Japan's debt and the costs inflicted by the 2011 Tōhoku earthquake and tsunami and the subsequent Fukushima nuclear disaster.

Political background 
The previous Prime Minister and DPJ president, Naoto Kan resigned on 26 August 2011 after the passage of the second extra budget for 2011. Kan's resignation triggered a DPJ leadership election, which was won by Finance Minister Yoshihiko Noda. On 2 September, Noda was formally appointed by the Emperor as the Japan's 95th Prime Minister and the third DPJ Prime Minister in two years.

The administration oversaw the first increase of consumption tax since 1997. Noda seek to increase the tax to gain more revenue to pay off Japan's debt and the cost of the recovery of the triple disaster. Long considered to be an unpopular policy, successive governments failed to enact the increase. The consumption tax increase also caused a split within the DPJ. While the consumption tax increase bill received wide support in the Diet, including from the LDP opposition, a major faction in the DPJ led by Ichirō Ozawa was strongly opposed to the policy. Ozawa and his faction decided to split from the DPJ on 11 July 2012, forming People's Life First which let the DPJ lost majority in the Diet. In exchange with LDP supported, Noda decided to hold snap election. The DPJ lost most of the seats while the LDP returned into the power after three years of opposition.

Following Fukushima radiation, Noda's government also oversaw further closedown of Japan's nuclear power plants, continuing his predecessor's policy. An exception to this was the Ōi Nuclear Power Plant in Fukui which was reopened in July 2012 to mitigate the damage inflicted to the plant-dependent local economy. The reopening was proven to be brief with both of the restarted reactors shut down again in September 2013.

Election of the Prime Minister

Lists of ministers 

R = Member of the House of Representatives
C = Member of the House of Councillors
 N = Non-Diet member
Italics denote acting minister

Cabinet

First Reshuffled Cabinet

Second Reshuffled Cabinet

Third Reshuffled Cabinet

References

External links 
 List of Ministers of the Noda Cabinet - Prime Minister's Office (Kantei)

Cabinet of Japan
2011 establishments in Japan
2012 disestablishments in Japan
Cabinets established in 2011
Cabinets disestablished in 2012
Yoshihiko Noda